Clayvin Julián Zúñiga Bernárdez (born 29 March 1991) is a Honduran professional footballer who plays as an forward for Liga Nacional club Marathón. He has played for the Honduras U-20 team and was part of the Honduras U-23 team as well.

Club career

RCD España
Zuniga began his professional career in Liga Nacional de Honduras side Real C.D. España, where he played from 2011 to 2012 and appeared in 12 league games. With España, he won the 2011–12 Honduran Liga Nacional.

Deportes Savio
He later joined another Honduran club Deportes Savio F.C. in 2012 and appeared in 51 league matches l, scoring 4 goals before moving to C.D. Real Sociedad in 2014.

Municipal Limeño
His most notable stint in club football was for El Salvador-based side Municipal Limeño, where he played 102 matches, scoring 37 goals. He won the Segunda División de El Salvador in 2016 with the club.

Churchill Brothers
On 20 September 2020, he signed for Indian I-League side Churchill Brothers SC.

He made his debut on 10 January 2021 against Indian Arrows in a 5–2 win. He scored the hat-trick in that debut match.

With Churchill, he scored a total of eight goals in 14 league matches, as the club finished as runners-up of the 2020–21 I-League, finished behind Gokulam Kerala.

C.D. FAS
In June 2021, Zuniga moved to El Salvador and signed with Primera División de Fútbol de El Salvador side C.D. FAS.

International career
Zúñiga was called up for the Honduras national under-20 football team in 2010. He has also represented Honduras national under-23 football team.

He represented Honduras at the 2011 CONCACAF U-20 Championship, where he appeared in 3 matches as Honduras reached the Quarter Finals before losing to Panama U20.

Zúñiga made his debut for the Honduras national football team on 27 September 2022 in a friendly game against Guatemala.

Honours
Real C.D. España
 Honduran Liga Nacional (Regular Season): 2011–12

Municipal Limeño
 Primera División de Fútbol de El Salvador (Apertura & Clausura): 2015–16

Churchill Brothers
 I-League: runner-up 2020–21

References

External links
 
 

1991 births
Living people
Honduran footballers
Honduras international footballers
Association football midfielders
Deportes Savio players
C.D. Real Sociedad players
Churchill Brothers FC Goa players
I-League players
Honduran expatriate footballers
Honduran expatriate sportspeople in El Salvador
Expatriate footballers in El Salvador
Expatriate footballers in India